Recoil is a magazine covering handguns, tactical rifles, tactical knives and other shooting-related activities in the United States. It caters to the firearms lifestyle.

The magazine primarily offers reviews on firearms, ammunition, knives, and shooting gear; as well as gunsmithing tips, historical articles, gun collecting, self-defense and automobiles. Each issue contains a few featured articles and personality profiles of people in the firearms industry as well as press releases of new products. Each issue includes a fold-out target.

Susannah Breslin of Forbes wrote that, "RECOIL is more Maxim than your dad's Guns & Ammo" with regard to the magazine's photography and subject matter.
RECOIL debuted in January 2012 as a quarterly magazine and by December 2012 became bi-monthly.

Iain Harrison became editor in January 2013.

In 2015, RECOIL won “Best Outdoor Sports & Recreation Magazine” at the 64th Annual Western Publishing Association "Maggie Awards" for its July issue.

References

External links
 

Bimonthly magazines published in the United States
Quarterly magazines published in the United States
Sports magazines published in the United States
Firearms magazines
Hunting and fishing magazines
Magazines established in 2012
Magazines published in Los Angeles
2012 establishments in California